US Post Office-Mount Vernon is a historic post office building located at Mount Vernon in Westchester County, New York, United States. It was built in 1915 and is one of a number of post offices designed by the Office of the Supervising Architect under direction of Oscar Wenderoth.  It is a two to three story, symmetrical building faced with limestone in the Classical Revival style. It is composed of a five bay central section with flanking one bay recessed wings.

It was listed on the National Register of Historic Places in 1989.

See also
National Register of Historic Places listings in southern Westchester County, New York

References

Mount Vernon
Government buildings completed in 1915
Neoclassical architecture in New York (state)
Buildings and structures in Westchester County, New York
Mount Vernon, New York
National Register of Historic Places in Westchester County, New York